Anthramine (1-aminoanthracene) (an organic compound with the chemical formula C14H11N.) is a fluorescent general anesthetic.

References

Aromatic amines
Anthracenes